Next Thing You Know is an American musical written by Joshua Salzman and Ryan Cunningham. The show follows four New Yorkers in their late twenties.

Development
Salzman and Cunnigham first met in New York University's graduate program in musical theater writing, where they began writing the songs that became their first musical I Love You Because.

Developed with director John Simpkins, Next Thing You Know was first presented as a song cycle at New York University

The show entered development with both Encore Theatre Company in the States as part of their Musicals in Development Initiative and Sell A Door Theatre Company in the UK.

Productions 
The show was put on in June 2011 at CAP21. It was directed by Terry Berliner, with scenic design by Andy Yanni, costume design by Julia Broer, lighting design by Brian Tovar, audio design by John Emmett O'Brien, and musically directed by Kurt Crowley. The show starred Lauren Molina (Waverly), Adam Kantor (Darren), Heath Calvert (Luke), and Lauren Blackman (Lisa).

The cast album was recorded with Lauren Blackman (Lisa), Colin Hanlon (Darren), Jay Armstrong Johnson (Luke), and Patti Murin (Waverly).

The show premiered in Paris, France in 2015 by American Musical Theatre Live
 staged by Tolgay Pekin featuring Lauren Berkman and Marion Préïté (Waverly), Frédéric Brodard and Vinicius Timmerman (Darren), Quentin Bruno (Luke) and Miranda Crispin (Lisa) with musical direction by Mathieu Becquerelle. The show continued its Paris run throughout 2016.

Plot overview
In the CAP21 production, the story follows Waverly, who lives in Manhattan and begins with her getting a promotion from the law firm she works at, going from temp to full-time while also bar tending at night. A result of this is the loss of her acting career, and the thought of losing it is hard for her to deal with. On top of that, her playwright boyfriend Darren does not understand why it is so hard. His reaction causes their breakup, and she begins a fling with the casanova Luke, who works in sales where Darren temps.

Characters
 Waverly - A woman in her late 20s. Actress who tends bar to make ends meet. Has struggled to build a career for herself as a performer since arriving in the city. Now has a non-performing day-job she loves, and a man she adores – but when they both look for her to move to the next level, it scares her to death. (Belter up to F5)
 Lisa - A woman in her late 20s. Candid musician who performs at their local dive bar and Waverly's best friend. Once dated Darren before coming out, and is now struggling to find the right woman. Faces the difficult decision as to whether or not she should move away from the city, start a new chapter, and leave her New York life behind. (Mezzo-Soprano).
 Darren - A man in his late 20s. Brooding and talented yet charming writer who dreams of settling down, while still pursuing his artistic endeavors. Thoughtful and loving guy, but at times very self-involved and distracted. Struggles to balance the life he wants with the woman he loves. (Baritone with falsetto)
 Luke - A man in his late 20s. Charismatic playboy who has everything he could ever want, but has a lot of growing up to do. A man-child, he has no intention of settling down – until a woman sneaks into his heart, and he's forced to decide between the dreams of a young cad and the life of a man. (Tenor up to C#)

Musical Numbers
 Prelude
 Little Bar On Sullivan Street - Waverly, Darren, Luke, Lisa
 Stay - Waverly, Lisa
 Morning After Omelet - Luke
 As Good As I Get - Darren
 We're Gonna Go Out - Darren, Waverly, Lisa, Luke
 The Way to Get a Girl - Darren, Luke
 Manhattan Bridge - Lisa
 How 'Bout You - Darren, Waverly
 Don't Say Another Word - Waverly
 We're Gonna Go Out (Reprise) - Darren
 Hungover - Darren, Waverly, Luke, Lisa
 And I Breathe - Luke
 If She Were Coming Home - Darren
 I Wish There Were a Reason - Waverly, Darren
 You Can't Be Everything You Want - Lisa
 Next Thing You Know - Waverly, Lisa
 All That I Want Is You - Darren, Waverly
 Next Thing You Know Finale - Luke, Lisa, Darren, Waverly
 Home Calls - Lisa

Reception
Catherine Rampell of the New York Times said the cast was "amiable and understated, ideal for CAP21’s black box rigged as an intimate theater in the round." She also noted the great performance of Kantor, but said the blocking was at time didactic and some of the songs were forced or forgettable. She positively concludes "the show still achieves a nearly effortless resonance — especially with any 20-something who has recently moved to the Big Pond that is the Big Apple."

External links 

 Official website

References

2011 musicals
American musicals